Irma Walther (14 September 1920 – 31 May 2005) was a German gymnast. She competed in seven events at the 1952 Summer Olympics.

References

1920 births
2005 deaths
German female artistic gymnasts
Olympic gymnasts of Germany
Gymnasts at the 1952 Summer Olympics
Sportspeople from Nuremberg